Francisco Coelho Maduro Dias (Angra do Heroismo, 12 February 1904 – Angra do Heroismo, 21 December 1986) was a Portuguese poet, painter, sculptor, illustrator, teacher, set designer and an overall "theatre man". He was one of the founders of the Instituto Histórico da Ilha Terceira (literally Historical Institute of Terceira Island), having an important role in the cultural scene of the first half of the Azorean twentieth century.

Biography
Projected the "Cruzeiro da Restauração da Independência" (literally Cruise of the Restoration of Independence), in Pico Matias Simão, in the parish of Altares, inaugurated on 8 December 1940.

On 14 June 1950 he was made a Knight of the Military Order of Saint James of the Sword.

Published works
Quadras para o Povo (1921) Angra do Heroísmo, Ed. Andrade
Em Nome de Deus Começo… (1929) Angra do Heroísmo, Tip Andrade
Dez Sonetilhos de Enlevo (1941) Angra do Heroísmo, Liv. Ed. Andrade
Sonetos de Esperança e de Sonho (1941) Angra do Heroísmo, Liv. Ed. Andrade
Vejo Sempre Mar em Roda (1963) Angra do Heroísmo, ed. do autor
Melodia Íntima e Poemas de Eiramá (1985) Colecção Gaivota n.º 45, Angra do Heroísmo, Secretaria Regional da Educação e Cultura

Bibliography
F. Pamplona. Dicionário de Pintores e Escultores Portugueses ou que trabalharam em Portugal (v. III). Porto: Ed. Civilização, 1987.
Rui Galvão de Carvalho (ed.). Antologia Poética dos Açores. Ponta Delgada: Secretaria Regional de Educação e Cultura, 1979.

References

External links
Francisco Coelho Maduro Dias in Enciclopédia Açoriana
Note to the press regarding the implementation of the activities to commemorate the centenary of "Mestre Maduro Dias" at the Museum in Angra do Heroísmo.

1904 births
1986 deaths
20th-century Portuguese poets
Portuguese male poets
People from Angra do Heroísmo
20th-century Portuguese sculptors
Male sculptors
20th-century Portuguese painters
20th-century male artists
20th-century male writers
Portuguese male painters